The Henderson Bridge is a railroad bridge spanning the Ohio River between Henderson, Kentucky and Vanderburgh County, Indiana. The bridge is owned by the CSX Transportation.

The original bridge was constructed in 1884 to 1885 by the Louisville and Nashville Railroad at a cost of $2,000,000. The bridge ran from the northern edge of Main Street in Henderson to the low water mark on the Indiana side, resting on 15 stone piers. A crowd of 8,000 watched the first train cross the bridge on July 13, 1885.

Prior to the opening of the bridge, railroad passengers and freight had to be transferred to a ferry for the river crossing. The bridge reduced the travel time by several hours.

By 1930 the volume and weight of train traffic were taxing the capabilities of the original bridge. Construction of a new bridge just upstream of the old one began in May 1931. The new bridge, costing over $3,000,000, opened on December 31, 1932. The demolition of the old bridge, using dynamite, was completed on December 11, 1933.

See also 
 List of crossings of the Ohio River
 Bi-State Vietnam Gold Star Bridges: a nearby road bridge over the Ohio River
 Interstate 69 Ohio River Bridge: a proposed nearby road bridge over the Ohio River

References

Buildings and structures in Henderson County, Kentucky
Louisville and Nashville Railroad
Bridges over the Ohio River
Bridges completed in 1932
Transportation buildings and structures in Vanderburgh County, Indiana
Railroad bridges in Indiana
Railroad bridges in Kentucky
Truss bridges in the United States
Transportation in Henderson County, Kentucky
CSX Transportation bridges
Henderson, Kentucky